Simeon Willis Memorial Bridge is a bridge crossing the Ohio River connecting US 23 and (US 60) in Ashland, Kentucky to US 52 in Coal Grove, Ohio. 

Opened in 1985, the bridge is named for Kentucky Governor Simeon S. Willis. The bridge was originally planned to cross at 45th St. and connect to a proposed Ashland bypass, but was instead built one block from the existing Ben Williamson Memorial Bridge and carries only northbound traffic.

The shorter Ohio portion of the bridge officially carries part of Ohio State Route 652 but is not signed as such.

See also
 
 
 
 
 List of crossings of the Ohio River

References

External links
 Simeon Willis Memorial Bridge at Bridges & Tunnels

Ashland, Kentucky
Road bridges in Ohio
Bridges over the Ohio River
Bridges completed in 1985
Transportation in Lawrence County, Ohio
Buildings and structures in Lawrence County, Ohio
Road bridges in Kentucky
Buildings and structures in Boyd County, Kentucky
Transportation in Boyd County, Kentucky
U.S. Route 60
Bridges of the United States Numbered Highway System
Cantilever bridges in the United States
1985 establishments in Kentucky
1985 establishments in Ohio